Ramsey Township is one of 20 townships in Fayette County, Illinois, USA.  As of the 2010 census, its population was 1,851 and it contained 822 housing units.

Geography

Cities, towns, villages
 Ramsey

Extinct towns
 Dressor

Cemeteries
The township contains these ten cemeteries: Bolt, Bolyard, Cothern Family, Hayes, Mathias, Monclovia, Mount Pleasant, Prater, Saint Josephs and Shedd.

Major highways
  US Route 51

Lakes
 Ramsey Lake

Landmarks
 Ramsey Lake State Recreation Area (east three-quarters)

Demographics

School districts
 Cowden-Herrick Community Unit School District 3a
 Ramsey Community Unit School District 204

Political districts
 Illinois' 17th congressional district
 State House District 98
 State House District 102
 State Senate District 49
 State Senate District 51

References
 
 United States Census Bureau 2007 TIGER/Line Shapefiles
 United States National Atlas

External links
 City-Data.com
 Illinois State Archives

Townships in Fayette County, Illinois
Populated places established in 1859
Townships in Illinois
1859 establishments in Illinois